Jacqueline Feather is a New Zealand born America-based screenwriter for television and film. Her credits include Malice in Wonderland (1985), The King and I (1999) and Kung Fu Killer (2008). With her then writing partner David Seidler she is a four times nominee and one time winner of the Writers Guild of America Award, winning in 1989. Today, aside from her writing she is a Jungian Analyst in private practice and a Training Analyst at the C.G. Jung Study Center of Southern California.

Biography
Born in New Zealand to art teacher parents, her grandfather was the theatre critic for National Radio. She took a B.F.A. at the University of Auckland in 1976 before moving to the United States in her early 20s where she followed a 25 year career as solo screenwriter and as a member of the Feather & Seidler writing team, with Academy Awards winner David Seidler. Among Feather's screenplays are Whose Child Is This? The War for Baby Jessica (1993), Dancing in the Dark (1995), Goldrush: A Real Life Alaskan Adventure (1988), Onassis: The Richest Man in the World (1988), Quest for Camelot (1998), Come On Get Happy: The Partridge Family Story (1999) and Son of the Dragon (2008).

Having taken an M.A. in Counseling Psychology and a Ph.D in Mythological Studies with an Emphasis in Depth Psychology at the Pacifica Graduate Institute (2001–2008), she then undertook six years analytic training.  Today she continues her writing alongside practicing as a Jungian Analyst/Depth psychotherapist in Ojai California, and is a Training Analyst at the C.G. Jung Study Center of Southern California.

Writing credits

Awards and nominations

References

External links
Feather on the Internet Movie Database

1950s births
Living people
University of Auckland alumni
New Zealand screenwriters
New Zealand women screenwriters
American women screenwriters
New Zealand emigrants to the United States
21st-century American women